Dumosa is a locality in Victoria, Australia, located approximately 21 km from Wycheproof, Victoria.

Dumosa was named after the tree White Mallee (Eucalyptus dumosa) which is common in the area. Dumosa Post Office opened on 6 July 1908 and closed in 1964.

References

Towns in Victoria (Australia)